Edward Ettingdere Bridges, 1st Baron Bridges,  (4 August 1892 – 27 August 1969), was a British civil servant.

Early life
Bridges was born on 4 August 1892 in Yattendon in Berkshire. He was the son of Robert Bridges, later Poet Laureate, and the pianist (Mary) Monica Waterhouse, daughter of the architect Alfred Waterhouse and niece of Price Waterhouse co-founder, Edwin Waterhouse. He was educated at Eton and Magdalen College, Oxford.

Career

Military service
Bridges then fought in the First World War with the Oxfordshire and Buckinghamshire Light Infantry. He achieved the rank of captain and was awarded the Military Cross.

Public service
He later joined the Civil Service and in 1938 he was appointed Cabinet Secretary, succeeding Sir Maurice Hankey. Bridges remained in this post until 1946, when he was made Permanent Secretary to the Treasury and Head of the Home Civil Service, a position he held until 1956. In his post-war memoirs, Winston Churchill praised Bridges' wartime work as Secretary to the War Cabinet, writing that not only was Bridges "an extremely competent and tireless worker, but he was also a man of exceptional force, ability, and personal charm, without a trace of jealousy in his nature."

After his retirement Lord Bridges served as Chancellor of the University of Reading. Moreover, he was given honorary degrees from several universities and appointed a Fellow of the Royal Society. He also published The State and the Arts, Romanes Lecture for 1958, Oxford, and The Treasury (Oxford University Press, 1964).

Personal life
Bridges married Katharine Dianthe Farrer, daughter of Thomas Farrer, 2nd Baron Farrer, on 6 June 1922. They had four children:

 Shirley Frances Bridges (1924–2015)
 Thomas Edward Bridges, 2nd Baron Bridges (1927–2017), a diplomat
 Robert Bridges (1930–2015) (an architect)
 Margaret Evelyn Bridges (1932–2014) a medieval historian. married, firstly, Trevor Aston, secondly Paul Buxton.

Lord Bridges died at Winterfold Heath, Surrey, on 27 August 1969, aged 77. He was succeeded in the barony by his eldest son Thomas Edward Bridges, a diplomat who served as British Ambassador to Italy from 1983 to 1987.

Honours

In the 1939 New Year Honours, Bridges was appointed to the Order of the Bath as a Knight Commander (KCB) and in the 1944 New Year Honours was promoted within the same Order as a Knight Grand Cross (GCB). In the 1946 Birthday Honours, Sir Edward was appointed to the Royal Victorian Order as a Knight Grand Cross (GCVO). Sir Edward was made a Fellow of the Royal Society in 1952 (FRS). He was then sworn of the Privy Council in the 1953 Coronation Honours. In 1957, he was raised to the peerage as Baron Bridges, of Headley in the County of Surrey, and of St Nicholas at Wade in the County of Kent. Lord Bridges was appointed to the Order of the Garter as a Knight Companion (KG) in 1965.

References

External links

 Family tree
 

1892 births
1969 deaths
Alumni of Magdalen College, Oxford
British Army personnel of World War I
Chancellors of the University of Reading
Fellows of the Royal Society
Knights of the Garter
Knights Grand Cross of the Order of the Bath
Knights Grand Cross of the Royal Victorian Order
Members of the Privy Council of the United Kingdom
People educated at Eton College
Oxfordshire and Buckinghamshire Light Infantry officers
Permanent Secretaries of HM Treasury
Recipients of the Military Cross
Cabinet Secretaries (United Kingdom)
1
Hereditary barons created by Elizabeth II
People of the British Council